Eddie Hamilton is a British film editor. He is a member of the American Cinema Editors.   In 2023 Hamilton is nominated for an Academy Award (Oscar) and a British Academy of Film and Television Arts (BAFTA) Award for his editing work on Top Gun: Maverick.

Selected filmography

References

External links 

Living people
Place of birth missing (living people)
Year of birth missing (living people)
American film editors
British film editors
British emigrants to the United States
American Cinema Editors